John Parr Snyder (12 April 1926 – 28 April 1997) was an American cartographer most known for his work on map projections for the United States Geological Survey (USGS). Educated at Purdue and MIT as a chemical engineer, he had a lifetime interest in map projections as a hobby, but found the calculations tedious without the benefit of expensive calculators or computers. At a cartography conference in 1976, he learned of the need for a map projection that would suit the special needs of Landsat satellite imagery. He had recently been able to purchase a pocket calculator (TI-59) of his own and set to work creating what became known as the space-oblique mercator projection, which he provided to the USGS at no charge.

He was subsequently offered a job within the USGS within two years, where his work apparently led him to the eventual publication of the definitive technical guide to map projections entitled Map Projections: A Working Manual among other works. He also authored Flattening the Earth: Two Thousand Years of Map Projections which details the historical development of hundreds of map projections. Snyder developed at least one other projection, called GS50, which uses a complex polynomial to project the 50 U.S. states with minimal distortion. He taught courses on map projection at George Mason University.  He was president of the American Cartographic Association (now CaGIS) from 1990–1991 and also served as a secretary to the Washington Map Society.

John Snyder died April 28, 1997.

Publications
 An album of map projections. USGS Professional Paper No. 1453. 1989. 
 Bibliography of map projections. USGS Bulletin No. 1856. 1988.
 Map Projections: A Working Manual USGS Professional Paper 1395. 1987.
 Map projections used for large-scale quadrangles by the U.S. Geological Survey. USGS Circular No. 982. 1986.
 Space Oblique Mercator projection mathematical development. USGS Bulletin No. 1518. 1981.

See also 
 Snyder equal-area projection

References

External links
 Further biographical information
 Donna Urschel Geography by the Numbers :Staff Member Solves Mystery of Mapping Equations, a biography of J.P. Snyder at the Library of Congress
 Information and electronic version of Map Projections: A Working Manual
 About the GS50 projection
 Obituary posted to CANSPACE forum

1926 births
1997 deaths
American cartographers
American civil servants
Purdue University alumni
Massachusetts Institute of Technology alumni
20th-century American geologists
United States Geological Survey personnel
20th-century cartographers